Dedan may refer to:

 Dedan, an ancient Arabian city-state located in the oasis of al-ʿUla
for the kingdom in its later phase, see Lihyan
for the city in the Bible, see Dedan (Bible)
 Dedan State, a former princely state in Gujarat, western India
 Dedan Kimathi, a leader of the Kenyan Mau Mau revolt
 Dedan, a major antagonist of the independent video game Off.